Finn Isaac Azaz (born 7 September 2000) is a professional footballer who plays as a midfielder for League One club Plymouth Argyle, on loan from Premier League club Aston Villa.

Azaz was a product of the West Bromwich Albion academy and spent the 2020–21 season on loan at Cheltenham Town. He moved to Aston Villa in July 2021 and was immediately loaned out to Newport County for the 2021–22 season. Azaz played for the Republic of Ireland under-21 side in September 2022.

Club career
Born in Westminster, Azaz joined West Bromwich Albion at the age of 9. He moved on loan to Cheltenham Town in August 2020. He made his professional debut in September 2020 in an EFL Cup 1–0 win over Peterborough United, and his first professional goal came in the same competition in the same month in a second round 3–1 loss to Championship side Millwall.

On 26 July 2021, Azaz joined Aston Villa and was immediately loaned out to Newport County for the 2021–22 season. He made his Newport debut on 10 August 2021, in a 1–0 EFL Cup victory over Ipswich Town, in which he provided an assist for the winning goal. Azaz scored his first goal for Newport on 24 September 2021 in the 2–1 League Two defeat to Barrow. Azaz was awarded the EFL Young Player of the Month award for January 2022 after three assists as his side picked up thirteen points from six matches.

At the 2022 EFL Awards, Azaz was awarded the League Two Young Player of the Season award as well as being named in the League Two Team of the Season with Newport County teammate Dom Telford.

On 11 July 2022, Azaz signed a contract extension with Aston Villa, and joined Plymouth Argyle on a season-long loan. Azaz made his first appearance for Plymouth on 30 July 2022, scoring a debut goal in 1–0 victory over Barnsley. On 25 October, Azaz suffered a "serious" ankle injury during a 2–1 victory over Shrewsbury Town which was expected to keep him sidelined for over 2 months. Azaz made his return to the Plymouth starting line-up on 21 January 2023 - with two assists in a 4–2 league victory over Cheltenham Town.

International career
Azaz was called up the Republic of Ireland under-21 side for the first time in September 2022. He made his international debut on 27 September 2022, in a 0–0 draw against Israel in a 2023 UEFA European Under-21 Championship qualification play off that Ireland lost in a penalty shootout.

Personal life
Born in England, Azaz is of Israeli and Irish descent.

Career statistics

Honours
Cheltenham Town
EFL League Two Champions: 2020–21

Individual
EFL Young Player of the Month: January 2022
EFL League Two Young Player of the Season: 2021–22
EFL League Two Team of the Season: 2021–22

References

2000 births
Living people
Footballers from Westminster
English footballers
English people of Israeli descent
English people of Irish descent
West Bromwich Albion F.C. players
Cheltenham Town F.C. players
Aston Villa F.C. players
Newport County A.F.C. players
Plymouth Argyle F.C. players
Association football midfielders
English Football League players
Republic of Ireland association footballers
Republic of Ireland youth international footballers
Republic of Ireland under-21 international footballers